Truro High School for Girls is a private day and boarding school for girls in Truro, Cornwall. The school consists of a girls-only prep school, senior school and sixth form. It is a member of the Girls' Schools Association.

History
The school was founded in 1880 by the future archbishop Edward White Benson, then Bishop of Truro. As well as establishing Truro High School, Benson also oversaw the building of Truro Cathedral before moving on to become Archbishop of Canterbury.

The school was started as an all-girls school with just seven pupils and moved to its present site in 1896. By the 1950s, pupil numbers were up to almost 500. During the early 1970s it was a direct grant grammar school before becoming independent when the tripartite system was abolished in 1976. Both boys and girls were in both its nursery and sixth Form at various stages in its development.

Its first headmistress was Amy Key, well known as the writer Mrs. Henry Clarke. A history of the school was written by her daughter Amy Key Clarke.

Admission
Admission into the school takes place throughout the year.

Girls join the prep school at various stages but entry at reception level is most common. Entry is subject to availability, an interview with the headmistress, a reference from the pupil’s current head teacher and a positive Taster Day. Girls do not sit entrance examinations but will be informally assessed during their Taster Day. Girls in the prep school are guaranteed automatic transfer into the senior school at the end of prep 6.

Most girls join the senior school in year 7, with about one third of the intake coming from the school's own prep 6 girls and the other two thirds coming from local primary schools, other prep schools or out of county. Entry is subject to interview with the headmistress, a positive Taster Day, a reference from the pupil's current head teacher and a successful 11+ entrance examination taken in the January of year 6. Girls sit three papers – mathematics, English andverbal reasoning with the first two papers set in line with the Key Stage 2 curriculum at Level 4 and higher.

Girls may join the senior school higher up the school subject to availability, an interview with the headmistress, a reference from the pupil’s current head teacher and a successful entrance examination. Girls would normally be expected to sit papers in mathematics, English and verbal reasoning but, on occasion, may also be tested in other subjects as well.

Each year girls join the sixth form from other schools. The entry requirements are 7 GCSE passes at grades C and above (or equivalent), a positive Taster Day and an interview with the headmistress. For those subjects to be studied at AS level, at least a grade B at GCSE (or equivalent) is required with most students offering grades A or A*. Prospective students are invited to have a Taster Day during year 11 (to fit in with their own current studies) and will spend the day as a sixth former joining in with as many of their AS level subject choice lessons as the timetable allows.

Curriculum
Girls in senior school are required to take English, mathematics, all three sciences, a foreign language, PE and a number of electives.

Years 7, 8 and 9 subjects include art and design, biology, chemistry, drama, English language, English literature, food and nutrition, French, geography, German, history, ICT, Latin, mathematics, music, physics, religious philosophy and ethics, Spanish, and textiles.

The girls also have timetabled PE lessons (2 hours per week in years 7–11).

In addition the school has a PHSE programme which supports and complements the school's Healthy School status. Topics covered include managing money, sex education, eating healthily, drug awareness, dealing with bullies, and study skills.

Dring year 8 girls start to consider their choice of subjects for GCSE, narrowing their options slightly ahead of the start of Year 9.

Core subjects are English language, English literature, mathematics, biology, chemistry, physics, one modern language (French or Spanish), and religious philosophy and ethics (short or long course).

The also select three further subjects from the following options: art, food and nutrition, French, geography, history, Latin, music, physical education, Spanish, textiles, theatre studies, astronomy, Ancient Greek, and computing.

Site and facilities
The prep and senior departments as well as the boarding houses are on the same campus and over the last 20 years the school have subsumed the previous Daniel Girls' Secondary School site to provide the Daniel Road campus which houses English, art, drama, modern foreign languages Departments as well as the performing arts studio and studio theatre.

In April 2012, work on a purpose-built music and drama block began, including 6 sound proofed rooms for peripatetic teaching, new music and drama classrooms and 2 performance areas for both music and drama. This work was completed in 2014.

There is also a 22.5 metre indoor swimming pool, netball, tennis courts and an astro-turf pitch.

Boarding
The school has about 50 boarders who live, during term time, in two boarding houses – Dalvenie for the girls from prep 6 to year 10 and Rashleigh House for those in years 11–13. The houses are located in the centre of the school campus and are home to girls from 12 different nationalities.

School publications
All pupils receive a copy of Highlights, a magazine highlighting events from the previous year. High Life newsletters are sent out every Friday to keep parents and pupils up-to-date with everything that goes on in the school community. The school also send regular school updates to parents.

Notable former pupils

 Morwenna Banks, comedian
 Vicki Young (b. 1970), political journalist
 Barbara West (1911–2007), second-to-last remaining survivor the Titanic sinking
 Lilian Knowles (1870-1926), professor of economic history at LSE and Britain's second professor of the subject

Further reading

Amy Key Clarke, The Story of Truro High School, the Benson Foundation: with a memoir of its first headmistress Amy Key. Truro: Oscar Blackford, 1979.

References

External links
School website
Profile on the Independent Schools Council website
Profile on The Good Schools Guide
Profile on MyDaughter

Girls' schools in Cornwall
Truro
Private schools in Cornwall
Educational institutions established in 1880
1880 establishments in England
Member schools of the Girls' Schools Association
Boarding schools in Cornwall